Herbert Pöck (born 8 March 1957) is an Austrian ice hockey player. He competed in the men's tournaments at the 1976 Winter Olympics, the 1984 Winter Olympics and the 1988 Winter Olympics.

References

1957 births
Living people
Olympic ice hockey players of Austria
Ice hockey players at the 1976 Winter Olympics
Ice hockey players at the 1984 Winter Olympics
Ice hockey players at the 1988 Winter Olympics
Sportspeople from Klagenfurt